Vivica Aina Fanny Bandler (5 February 1917 – 30 July 2004) was a Finnish-Swedish theatre director and agronomist.  She bought a theatre (Lilla Teatern) in Helsinki in 1955 and is credited for popularizing avant-garde Finnish theatre. She was also theatre director in Oslo (1967-69) and at the Stockholm City Theatre (1969-1979).

Early life and education

Vivica von Frenckell was born in Helsinki, Finland, in 1917. She was the daughter of Helsinki Mayor Erik von Frenckell and theatre historian Ester-Margaret Lindberg. She studied agronomy, graduating in 1943. She then maintained her family home, Saari Manor, a historic home located in Tammela, Finland. She served in the Lotta Svärd during World War II and married Austrian Kurt Bandler in 1943; they divorced in 1963.

In 1946, she became involved in a love affair with the Finnish-Swedish writer Tove Jansson, which is documented by a series of letters they exchanged in subsequent years. Jansson incorporated the pair of them into her Moomin series as Thingumy and Bob (named for Tove and Vivica respectively). Bandler eventually decided to stay with her husband, but the two women maintained a lifelong friendship. Bandler adapted two of Jansson's Moomin stories for theatre. In cooperation with her husband, she translated the first three Moomin books into German.

Theater work

After the war she started working in an amateur theatre in Tammela. She studied, in Paris, France in the 1930s, under a French movie director. Upon her return to Helsinki she sought to become a film director, but because of her gender, the opportunity was lacking. She went on to get her degree in agriculture, instead.

In 1939, she founded Helsinki's first Swedish student theatre, Studentteatern. Bandler also served as director of the theatre. When visiting film directors came to film in Finland she often served as translator, such as Jacques Feyder. In 1962, she was awarded the Pro Finlandia medal of the Order of the Lion of Finland. She was also a Commander of the Order of the Polar Star.

Legacy

Film director Tuija-Maija Niskanen made the film  based on Bandler's life.

References

Further reading
 Ahlfors, Bengt: Människan Vivica Bandler: 82 skisser till ett porträtt Helsinki: Schildts, 2011. 
 Bandler, Vivica & Backström, Carita: Adressaten okänd. (Autobiography.) Stockholm: Norstedt 1992. 
 Granath, Sara: 
 Pöysti, Lasse: Jalat maahan. Otava 1991.

External links
Official website

1917 births
2004 deaths
Artists from Helsinki
People from Uusimaa Province (Grand Duchy of Finland)
Swedish-speaking Finns
Finnish people of German descent
Finnish theatre directors
LGBT theatre directors
Finnish military personnel of World War II
20th-century Finnish LGBT people